Tocino is a surname. Notable people with the surname include:

Isabel Tocino (born 1949), Spanish politician
José Belizón Tocino (1930–1997), Spanish painter